Erwin Thaler (May 21, 1930 in Innsbruck – November 29, 2001) is an Austrian bobsledder who competed in the 1960s. He won two silver medals in the four-man event at the 1964 and 1968 Winter Olympics.

Thaler also won two medals at the FIBT World Championships with gold in the two-man event in 1967 and a bronze in the four-man event in 1963.

References
 Bobsleigh four-man Olympic medalists for 1924, 1932-56, and since 1964
 Bobsleigh two-man world championship medalists since 1931
 Bobsleigh four-man world championship medalists since 1930
 DatabaseOlympics.com profile

1930 births
2001 deaths
Sportspeople from Innsbruck
Austrian male bobsledders
Bobsledders at the 1964 Winter Olympics
Bobsledders at the 1968 Winter Olympics
Olympic bobsledders of Austria
Olympic silver medalists for Austria
Olympic medalists in bobsleigh
Medalists at the 1964 Winter Olympics
Medalists at the 1968 Winter Olympics